Harry Woodyard may refer to:

 Harry C. Woodyard (1867–1929), U.S. Representative from West Virginia 
 Harry Woodyard (Illinois politician) (1930–1997), American politician, businessman, and farmer